Mozdahir (also known as the Mozdahir International Institute; French name: Institut Mozdahir International or IMI) is an international non-governmental organization based in Dakar, Senegal.

Overview
It has branches in different African countries, such as Senegal, Mali, Ivory Coast, Guinea Bissau, Burkina Faso, and other countries. Mozdahir was founded in 2000 by Cherif Mohamed Aly Aidara, one of the main Shi'i religious leaders of Senegal. The NGO works on development projects relating to education, health, agriculture, environment, reforestation, and solar energy, and has partnered with other major NGOs such as the World Food Programme.

Mozdahir is headquartered in Dakar, near the University of Dakar's campus. The NGO's main campus in Dakar includes a library and educational facilities. Mozdahir also has a quarterly magazine, regularly hosts conferences, and hosts a radio station called Mozdahir FM 93.2 in Guédiawaye, Dakar, which is the only Shi'i radio station currently being broadcast in Senegal. It carries out many development projects in the Casamance region of southern Senegal, as well as in various parts of West Africa. The organization manages diverse rural development projects, including the creation of new banana plantations in villages such as Nadjaf Al Ashraf.

Projects
To date, Mozdahir has built:

Lycées in Bamako, Mali and Ouagadougou, Burkina Faso
CAPE Maimouna Diao orphanage in Kolda, Senegal
Al Mahdi School, a private school in Kolda, Senegal
an Islamic center in Bafatá, Guinea Bissau
a cultural center in Vélingara, Senegal
new forests in Kolda Region, southern Senegal and Thiès Region, western Senegal

See also

Agriculture in Senegal
Shia Islam in Senegal

References

Diop, Macoumba (2013). L'introduction du chiisme au Sénégal. In Histoire, monde et cultures religieuses 2013/4 (n° 28), pages 63–77.

External links
Mozdahir International Institute

International nongovernmental organizations
Cultural organisations based in Senegal
Educational organisations based in Senegal
Environmental organisations based in Senegal
Rural community development
Organisations based in Dakar
2000 establishments in Senegal